Patrik Iľko (born 16 February 2001) is a Slovak professional footballer who currently plays for Fortuna Liga club MŠK Žilina as a forward.

Club career

MŠK Žilina
Iľko made his Fortuna Liga debut for Žilina during an away fixture against Pohronie on 22 February 2020. He came on in the second half's stoppage time to replace Dávid Ďuriš and delay the play along with Kristián Vallo, who replaced Benson Anang. Žilina collected a narrow 0:1 victory after a goal by Dawid Kurminowski of the 75th minute.

References

External links
 MŠK Žilina official club profile
 
 Futbalnet profile
 

2001 births
Living people
People from Bardejov
Sportspeople from the Prešov Region
Slovak footballers
Slovakia youth international footballers
Slovakia under-21 international footballers
Association football forwards
MŠK Žilina players
2. Liga (Slovakia) players
Slovak Super Liga players